One Hope United (OHU) is an American non-profit organization established in 1895 that provides education, foster care, adoption, and other support services to children and families in the U.S. states of Illinois, Florida, and Missouri. The organization is headquartered in Chicago, Illinois. According to the organization, it serves over 10,000 children and families annually. It is reported to have previously also operated in Wisconsin, but the organization's website no longer reports any operations in the state.

History 
The organization was founded on October 8, 1895, in Downers Grove, Illinois (a suburb of Chicago) under the name “Chicago Baptist Orphanage”. The organization opened an orphanage for children on Washington Street in Downers Grove. By 1913, the organization was operating four orphanages in Illinois (Downers Grove, Berwyn, Chicago, and Maywood).

During the 1940s, Ermit L. Finch arrived at the organization's Lake Villa campus after his parents died. Finch became the first person that was previously a resident to become a board member of the organization. In 2019, the organization renamed its Lake Villa campus the “Ermit L. Finch Campus” in honor of Finch.

Prior to adopting the name “One Hope United”, the organization also operated under the names, “Central Baptist Children’s Home” and “Kids Hope United”. The current name was adopted in 2010.

In January 2019, Dr. Charles A. Montorio-Archer was named the chief executive officer. He is both the first openly gay person and the first black person to lead the organization as President and CEO. Prior to Montorio-Archer's role at OHU, he was the co-founder of the New York non-profit organization, The THRIVE Network (now merged with The New York Foundling).

In response to COVID-19, many of the organization's classrooms were closed and two educational centers closed permanently.

References 

1895 establishments in Illinois
Adoption in the United States
Non-profit organizations based in Illinois